Générations is a French radio station based in Paris and created in 1992, dedicated to several genres such as hip-hop (rap music and R&B), soul music and disco. On June 15, 1992, EFM Intergénération was definitively authorized to broadcast on the Paris FM band by the CSA.

External links

References 

Radio stations in France
Radio in Paris
Radio stations established in 1992